Starlord is an open-ended, computer moderated, space-based play-by-mail game. Designed and moderated by Mike Singleton, gameplay began initially in the United Kingdom, with Flying Buffalo launching a version in the United States in 1983. Gameplay is limited to 50 players roleplaying as Starlords with the goal of becoming emperor by conquering the Throne Star. Starlord was reviewed multiple times in magazines such as Dragon and The Space Gamer in the early 1980s, receiving generally positive reviews, with one reviewer noting the possibility of the game lasting for years.

Publication history
Mike Singleton designed Starlord. He moderated the game using his Commodore PET. Singleton started gameplay in the United Kingdom, but as of 1983, Flying Buffalo began running the game in the United States as well.

Starlord was based on a 1977 board game of the same name invented by Gary Bedrosian and Lee Elmendorf.

Gameplay
The game depicted a galactic empire on the decline, in a 1000-star galaxy, in which 50 players took the part of "starlords" trying to become emperor by conquering the Throne Star. At the outset, players controlled one Base Star out of 1,000 available. The "Empyr" controlled the non-assigned stars, "with up to ten ships at each and several hundred at the central Throne Star". However, "sadly, the last Emperor has died, and the Empyr is run by imperial computers", proving an opportunity for players to seize the throne. A player that took the Throne Star received various benefits, including control of the Empyr's forces and free turns, but also acquired "up to 49 enemies".

Lee Simpson noted in the Winter 1983 issue of Flagship magazine that "Mike Singleton has since admitted, in earlier Starlord games the Throne Star was initially too lightly garrisoned", allowing players to become Emperor early in the game.

Reception
W.G. Armintrout reviewed Starlord in the March 1982 issues of The Space Gamer. Armintrout commented that "In my opinion, Starlord is one of the top five PBM games going. I highly recommend it to all gamers, even those who have never yet tried this type of game."

In the April 1983 edition of Dragon (Issue 72), Michael Gray stated "A player who becomes Emperor early in a game, and is then dethroned and eliminated, may still win the game by accumulating lots of points during his or her reign. But with 50 players per game, Starlord could take many years to complete."

W.G. Armintrout reviewed Starlord again in the May–June 1983 issue of The Space Gamer. Armintrout commented that "Starlord continues to receive my highest recommendation – a masterpiece of game design, ridiculously easy to play yet moderately challenging.  Those who have never tried PBM could start here.  I have only two quibbles: You can't choose your player name (you are named after your Base Star), and the map should have a circular frame."

See also
 List of play-by-mail games

References

Flying Buffalo games
Play-by-mail games